Liebling (German for "darling") may refer to:

Music 
 Liebling (album), a 1999 album by Andreas Johnson

People 
 A. J. Liebling, an American journalist for The New Yorker
 Alison Liebling (born 1963), British criminologist and academic
 Beth Liebling, bassist and drummer for the instrumental group Hovercraft
 Bobby Liebling, an American singer of the heavy metal band Pentagram
 Debbie Liebling, president of production for 20th Century Fox Atomic
 Estelle Liebling, an operatic soprano, voice teacher, and vocal coach
 Helen Liebling, a British Clinical Psychologist and academic
 Jerome Liebling, an American photographer and filmmaker
 Jonathan Liebling, a British Medicinal Cannabis Expert and Campaigner
 Leonard Liebling, an American music critic, concert pianist, composer, librettist, and long time editor-in-chief of the Musical Courier
 Leonard Irving Liebling, a British Consultant Psychiatrist and a Founder of The Royal College of Psychiatry in 1972
 Max Liebling, a German born American concert pianist, composer, conductor, and music teacher
 Mordechai Liebling, a rabbi and former director of the Jewish Reconstructionist Federation
 Roman Polanski (né Liebling) French-Polish filmmaker and fugitive
 Tina Liebling, a politician and attorney from the U.S. state of Minnesota

Places 
 Liebling, Timiș, a commune in Romania